Taylor Stoehr (1931–2013) was an American professor and author. He edited several volumes of Paul Goodman's work as his literary executor.

Works 

 Dickens: The Dreamer's Stance (1965)
 Hawthorne's Mad Scientists: Pseudoscience and Social Science (1978)
 Nay-Saying in Concord: Emerson, Alcott, and Thoreau (1979)
 Here Now Next: Paul Goodman and the Origins of Gestalt Therapy (1994)

Edited

 Paul Goodman's Collected Poems (1976)
 Drawing the Line: The Political Essays of Paul Goodman (1977)
 Creator Spirit Come: The Literary Essays of Paul Goodman (1977)
 Nature Heals: The Psychological Essays of Paul Goodman (1977)
 The Collected Stories of Paul Goodman (1978–1980, four volumes)
 Crazy Hope & Finite Experience: Final Essays of Paul Goodman (1994)
 Decentralizing Power: Paul Goodman's Social Criticism (1994)
 Format & Anxiety: Paul Goodman Critiques the Media (1995)
 The Paul Goodman Reader (2011)

References

External links 

 
 
 

1931 births
2013 deaths
American writers
University of Massachusetts Boston faculty
Paul Goodman